Noura bint Mohammed Al Saud is a Saudi royal and a businesswoman. She is the founder and owner of Nuun Jewels and is a jewelry designer.

Early life and education
Noura bint Mohammed was born in Saudi Arabia. She is a great granddaughter of King Faisal. She is the daughter of Mohammed bin Abdullah, a son of Abdullah bin Faisal. Her mother is Nouf bint Khalid, a daughter of King Khalid.

Noura is a graduate of King Saud University and holds a bachelor's degree in English literature. She also studied interior design at Richmond University in London. She participated Place Vendôme workshop on jewelry in Paris.

Career
Noura bint Mohammed designed various high jewellery for private clients until 2014 when she founded Nuun Jewels, a jewellery house, which is located in Rue du Faubourg Saint-Honoré, Paris. The word, Nuun, is a reference to her nickname, Nu.

In 2019 Noura also opened a branch of Nuun Jewels in Riyadh. She has exhibited her jewelry collection in different cities, including Paris, at the Four Seasons George V, Riyadh, Manama, Dubai and Monaco.

In 2018 Noura bint Mohammed started a platform to assist the design industry and emerging designers in Saudi Arabia which is named Adhlal. In 2020 Forbes Middle East named her as the sixth most successful Saudi female entrepreneur who developed a native brand.

Personal life
Noura bint Mohammed lives in Riyadh and Paris, and is married to Faisal Al Shawaf, a Saudi architectural engineer and the president of Saud Consulting Services. Faisal Al Shawaf is a graduate of Wentworth Institute of Technology, Boston.

References

Noura
Noura
Noura
Noura
Living people
Noura
Noura
Noura
Noura
Year of birth missing (living people)